Eupithecia lini is a moth in the family Geometridae. It is found in Taiwan.

The wingspan is about 29–30 mm. The forewings are pale ash grey and the hindwings are white.

References

Moths described in 2007
lini
Moths of Asia